The canton of Dax-2 is an administrative division of the Landes department, southwestern France. It was created at the French canton reorganisation which came into effect in March 2015. Its seat is in Dax.

It consists of the following communes:
 
Bénesse-lès-Dax
Candresse
Dax (partly)
Heugas
Narrosse
Oeyreluy
Saint-Pandelon
Saugnac-et-Cambran
Seyresse
Yzosse

References

Cantons of Landes (department)